Frank Albert Rinehart (February 12, 1861 – December 17, 1928) was an American photographer who captured Native American personalities and scenes, especially portrait settings of leaders and members of the delegations who attended the 1898 Indian Congress in Omaha.

Biography
German American Rinehart was born in Lodi (now Maple Park), Illinois. He and his brother, Alfred, moved to Colorado in the 1870s and found employment at the Charles Bohm photography studio, in Denver. In 1881 the Rinehart brothers formed a partnership with Western photographer William Henry Jackson, who had achieved widespread fame for his images of the West. Under Jackson's teachings, Rinehart's perfected his professional skills, and developed a keen interest in Native American culture. Frank Rinehart and Anna, the receptionist of Jackson's studio, married and in 1885 moved to Nebraska. In downtown Omaha, Rinehart opened a studio in the Brandeis Building, where he worked until his death.

Rinehart married Anna Ransom Johnson (daughter of Willard Bemis Johnson and Phebe Jane Carpenter) on 5 September 1885 in Denver County, Colorado.  They had two daughters, Ruth and Helen, both born in Nebraska.

In 1898, and in occasion of the Indian Congress held in conjunction with the Trans-Mississippi and International Exposition, Rinehart was commissioned to photograph the event and the Native American personalities who attended it. Together with his assistant Adolph Muhr (who would later be employed by the photographer Edward S. Curtis), they produced what is now considered "one of the best photographic documentations of Indian leaders at the turn of the century". Tom Southall, former photograph curator at the University of Kansas' Spencer Art Museum, said of the Rinehart collection:

Rinehart and Muhr photographed American Indians at the Indian Congress in a studio on the Exposition grounds with an 8 x 10 glass-negative camera with a German lens. Platinum prints were produced to achieve the broad range of tonal values that medium afforded.

After the Indian Congress, Rinehart and Muhr travelled the Indian reservations for two years, portraying Native American leaders who had not attended the event, as well as depicting general aspects of the indigenous everyday life and culture.

The collection of Rinehart Indian Photographs is currently preserved at Haskell Indian Nations University. Since 1994, the collection has been organized, preserved, copied, and cataloged in a computer database, funded by the Bureau of Indian Affairs and the Hallmark Foundation. It includes images from the 1898 Exposition, the 1899 Greater America Exposition, studio portraits from 1900, and photographs by Rinehart taken at the Crow Agency in Montana also in 1900.

References
Beyond the Reach of Time and Change: Native American Reflections on the Frank A. Rinehart Photograph Collection, by Simon J. Ortiz. University of Arizona Press (April 28, 2005)

Gallery

External links

LJWorld Photogalleries: Frank Rinehart
U.S. department of Interior Museum (online gallery of the 1898 Trans-Mississippi and International Exposition)
Boston Public Library. Photos by Rinehart

American portrait photographers
Artists of the American West
American people of German descent
Native Americans in art
Artists from Omaha, Nebraska
1861 births
1928 deaths
People from Maple Park, Illinois
Photographers from Nebraska
Photographers from Illinois
19th-century American photographers
20th-century American photographers